In English football, the Essex derby is the local derby between the two professional teams in the English county of Essex – Colchester United and Southend United. The first Essex derby match that took place was a 4–2 victory for Southend in a Third Division South tie on 14 October 1950. The derby has been contested in four different competitions, with Southend winning 34 of the games, Colchester winning 31 and 17 have been drawn.

History
Southend United were one of 24 teams that co-founded The Football League's new Third Division in 1920 for the upcoming 1920–21 season. Colchester United were promoted into The Football League, joining the Third Division South for the 1950–51 season. The first match between Colchester United and Southend United was 14 October 1950, a Third Division South game won by Southend 4–2.

From 1989 to 2004, the two clubs did not meet in any competitive fixtures. The two clubs both reached the Football League Trophy Southern Area Final, where they met for the first time in 15 years on 10 February 2004, at Layer Road for the first leg, with Southend winning 3–2. They met six days later at Roots Hall, for the Southern Area Final second leg, where the teams drew 1–1 and Southend winning 4–3 on aggregate to reach the overall final of the Football League Trophy at the Millennium Stadium, Cardiff.

During an Essex derby match on 25 November 2006, there were three dismissals, two for Southend and one for Colchester. Southend's captain, Kevin Maher was sent-off in the 51st minute for an off-the-ball incident involving Colchester's captain, Karl Duguid. Maher claimed that Duguid had cheated by conning the referee due to his over-reacting, and claimed; "He clipped my leg, so I turned to say 'What are you doing?' and he fell over clutching his face like he'd been poleaxed by Mike Tyson." Duguid stated in his defence; "He chested me and put his face in my face. That's a headbutt, a sending-off offence." Mark Gower picked up a yellow card for dissent after arguing with the referee, Steve Bennett, about the sending off. Five minutes later, Gower was booked again, this time for a late challenge on Duguid. Chris Barker was sent-off in the 78th minute, after he was booked twice. Southend appealed against the red card, which was rejected by The Football Association's disciplinary commission.

The Essex derby returned for the 2015–16 League One season after Southend were promoted through the League Two play-offs, seeing a return of the fixture for the first time since the 2009–10 season. Southend won the first match between the sides in five years on 26 December 2015 by 2–0 at the Colchester Community Stadium. The match at Roots Hall during the same season was a fiery affair which saw Colchester vice-captain Alex Gilbey sent off for a foul on Southend's Ryan Leonard in the first-half. After former U's player Anthony Wordsworth had put the Shrimpers ahead in the 82nd-minute, Adam Barrett soon doubled the home side's advantage before crowd trouble started. After Barrett had run the length of the pitch to celebrate close to the away fans, a lone Southend supporter jumped onto the pitch and began throwing punches at the Colchester fans. Stewards eventually restrained the man, while other fans had also followed suit in jumping on the pitch, but further violence was avoided after Southend players, police and stewards ushered the fans back into the stands. Police said that the matter would be investigated after video evidence emerged. The game ended 3–0 to Southend. The man involved in the incident admitted affray and pitch invasion at Southend Magistrates Court on 24 February. He was give an eight-week suspended prison sentence and was ordered to pay £265 in fines, while receiving a five-year banning order that prohibits him from attending any football match in the country until 2021.

The largest Essex derby victory was recorded on 10 November 2020, when Colchester beat Southend 6–1 at the Community Stadium. Jevani Brown registered a hat-trick for the U's in the dead rubber EFL Trophy group stage match.

Statistics and results

Colchester United in the league at home

Southend United in the league at home

Cup Matches

Summary of results

Statistics correct as of 26 December 2020.

Shared player history
Notable players who have been transferred directly between the clubs are listed below.

Colchester to Southend

Southend to Colchester

Notes
1. : Southend won 3–5 on penalties.
2. : 11v11.com excludes the 13 August 1982 Football League Group Cup match.
3. : Pat Baldwin also appeared on loan from Colchester for Southend, making 18 appearances and scoring 1 goal.
4. : John White also appeared on loan from Colchester for Southend, making 6 appearances.
5. : Alex Smith also appeared on loan from Southend for Colchester, making 11 appearances.
6. : Adam Locke also appeared on loan from Southend for Colchester, making 5 appearances.

References

Derby
Derby
Football in Essex
England football derbies